Edgerton Junction is an unincorporated community in Platte County, in the U.S. state of Missouri. It is within the Kansas City metropolitan area.

The community is on a hilltop overlooking the Platte River which flows past one-half mile to the east. Edgerton is three miles to the northeast at the intersection of Missouri routes B and Z.

History
The community was named for the fact it was a junction of the Chicago, Rock Island and Pacific Railway near Edgerton.  A post office called Edgerton Junction was established in 1899, and remained in operation until 1916.

References

Unincorporated communities in Platte County, Missouri
Unincorporated communities in Missouri